Chesterfield may refer to:

Places

Canada 
 Rural Municipality of Chesterfield No. 261, Saskatchewan
 Chesterfield Inlet, Nunavut

United Kingdom
Chesterfield, Derbyshire, a market town in England
 Chesterfield (UK Parliament constituency)
 Borough of Chesterfield, a district of Derbyshire
 Chesterfield, Staffordshire, a location in England
 Chesterfield House, Westminster

United States
 Chesterfield, Connecticut
 Chesterfield, Idaho
 Chesterfield Historic District listed on the National Register of Historic Places (NRHP)
 Chesterfield, Illinois
 Chesterfield Township, Macoupin County, Illinois
 Chesterfield, Indiana
 Chesterfield, Massachusetts, and two districts listed on the NRHP:
 Chesterfield Center Historic District
 West Chesterfield Historic District
 Chesterfield, Michigan
 Chesterfield Township, Michigan
 Chesterfield, Missouri
 Chesterfield, New Hampshire
 Chesterfield Township, New Jersey
 Chesterfield, New Jersey
 Chesterfield, New York
 Chesterfield Township, Fulton County, Ohio
 Chesterfield County, South Carolina, and its county seat:
 Chesterfield, South Carolina
 Chesterfield, Tennessee
 Chesterfield (Mascot, Tennessee), listed on the NRHP in Tennessee
 Chesterfield, Utah, a neighborhood in West Valley City
 Chesterfield County, Virginia, and its county seat:
 Chesterfield Court House, Virginia, a census-designated place
 Chesterfield Heights Historic District, Norfolk, Virginia, listed on the NRHP

Elsewhere 
 Chesterfield Islands, a French archipelago in South Pacific
 Chesterfield Trough, a trough in the Coral Sea

Other uses 
 Chesterfield (cigarette), a brand of cigarette
 Chesterfield (typeface)
 Chesterfield coat, a long, tailored overcoat
 Chesterfield College, Chesterfield, England
 Chesterfield F.C., the football team of Chesterfield, Derbyshire, England
 Chesterfield Inn, Myrtle Beach, South Carolina, listed on the NRHP, now demolished
 Chesterfield Pictures, a film company active from 1925 to 1936 until it was merged into Republic Pictures
 Chesterfield sofa, upholstered furniture suitable for seating multiple people
 Earl of Chesterfield, head of an aristocratic family from Derbyshire, England
 The Chesterfields, an English indie pop band
 HMS Chesterfield, three ships of the Royal Navy
 Chesterfield (1791 ship)

See also 
 Fort Chesterfield (disambiguation), the name of several places and ships
 The Bing Crosby – Chesterfield Show, a 1949–1952 radio show